Taplejung District is one of 77 districts of Nepal and one of the 14 districts of Koshi Province. It is remotely located in the Himalayas in Eastern Nepal with Tibet to the north across the Himalayas. Taplejung is the third largest district (by area) of Nepal.

The district is surrounded by Tibet in the north, Sankhuwasabha District in the west, Tehrathum District and Panchthar District in the south and Sikkim (India) in the east. Geographically, the district is located at a latitude of 27º 06’ to 27º 55’N and a longitude of 87º57’ to 87º40’ E.

Etymology
Literally meaning of Taplejung is "a fort of King Taple" in Limbu language. There was a fort situated at that area in medieval times which was built by King Taple.

History

Before the unification of Nepal, the area of Taplejung and its surrounds were called Pallo Kirat Limbuwan which means "far region" and was ruled by the Limbu kings of Limbuwan.

After the unification of Nepal, the area of Taplejung became a part of the large Dhankuta District.

In 1962 when the traditional old 32 districts divided into 75, the three thums (counties) of the large Dhankuta district separately established a new district named "Taplejung".

Geography and climate
Geographically Taplejung is a mountainous district where the world's third highest peak Kanchenjunga (8586 m) is located.

The Tamor River is a main river in the district, which flows through the middle in the district dividing district in east and west Taplejung. Gunsa river, Simbuwa river and the many tributaries of Tamur are important sources of freshwater. There are more than 60 rivers and streams in the district. Some glacial lakes are: Sinjenma Pokhari, Samdo Pokhari, Tin Pokhari, Kali Pokhari etc.   

The district includes many highest peaks e.g. Gimmigela (7350 m), talung (7349 m), Kabru (7276 m),  Nepal peak (7177 m), Kumbhkarna (7025 m) etc.

Demographics
At the time of the 2011 Nepal census, Taplejung District had a population of 127,461. Of these, 38.0% spoke Limbu, 37.2% Nepali, 10.7% Sherpa, 4.0% Tamang, 3.1% Gurung, 2.0% Rai, 0.9% Walung, 0.7% Magar, 0.7% Newar, 0.7% Sunuwar, 0.4% Bantawa, 0.2% Yakkha, 0.1% Chamling, 0.1% Maithili, 0.1% Sampang, 0.1% Sign language and 0.5% other languages as their first language.

In terms of ethnicity/caste, 41.6% were Limbu, 11.9% Chhetri, 9.5% Sherpa, 7.8% Hill Brahmin, 5.1% Rai, 4.7% Kami, 4.6% Gurung, 4.4% Tamang, 1.6% Newar, 1.5% Damai/Dholi, 1.1% Sunuwar, 1.1% Topkegola, 1.0% Magar, 0.9% Sarki, 0.9% Walung, 0.7% Sanyasi/Dasnami, 0.4% Bhote, 0.4% Gharti/Bhujel, 0.2% other Dalit, 0.2% Yakkha, 0.1% Khawas, 0.1% Teli, 0.1% Tharu and 0.2% others.

In terms of religion, 41.4% were Kirati, 35.9% Hindu, 20.5% Buddhist, 1.5% Christian, 0.5% Bon and 0.2% others.

In terms of literacy, 71.0% could read and write, 2.8% could only read and 26.1% could neither read nor write.

Administration
Taplejung District is administered by Taplejung District Coordination Committee (Taplejung DCC). The Taplejung DCC is elected by Taplejung District Assembly. The head of Taplejung DCC is Mr. Ghanendra Maden and Mrs. Devimaya Nepali is deputy head of Taplejung DCC.

Taplejung District Administration Office under Ministry of Home Affairs co-operate with Taplejung DCC to maintain peace, order and security in the district. The officer of District Administration office called CDO and current CDO of Taplejung DAO is Dorendra Niraula.

Taplejung District Court is a Judicial court to see the cases of people on district level.

Division
Taplejung is divided in total 9 local level bodies, in which only Phungling is an urban municipality otherwise all other local level bodies are rural municipality.

Former administrative divisions

Formerly, Taplejung had one municipality and many VDCs. VDCs were the local level administrative units for villages.

Fulfilling the requirement of the new constitution of Nepal 2015, on 10 March 2017 all VDCs were nullified and formed new units after grouping VDCs.

Constituencies

Taplejung District consists 1 Parliamentary constituency and 2 Provincial constituencies

Transportation
Taplejung (headquarters) is connected to the rest of Nepal by the Mechi Highway which meets the east–west or Mahendra Highway at Charali (Mechinagar). A person can travel from Kathmandu to Taplejung by public bus, jeep or by flight. Taplejung Airport is a nearest airport.

Tourism
Taplejung is a best destination for trekkers. Kanchenjunga Conservation Area comprises cultivated lands, forests, pastures, rivers, high altitude lakes and glaciers. snow leopard, Asian black bear, red panda, golden-breasted fulvetta, snow cock, blood pheasant and red-billed chough can be seen in the area. Pathibhara Devi Temple or Mukkumlung Manghim at Taplejung hill is considered as the home to Yuma Sammang, the deity of Limbu people and thus worshipped. A 16th century Diki Chhyoling monastery lies in Olangchung-gola.

See also
Sankhuwasabha District
Solukhumbu District
Koshi Province
Kanchenjunga
Jannu

References

 
Districts of Nepal established in 1962
Districts of Koshi Province